Wāli-ūllah Abū'l-Mansūr Khan (romanized: Uäliūllah Äbılmansūr Han), better known as Abylai Khan or Ablai Khan (May 23, 1711 — May 23, 1781) was a Kazakh khan of the Middle jüz (central region) of the Kazakh Khanate.

Life
Born as Wali-ullah Abu'l-Mansur Khan, Abylai Khan belonged to the senior branch of descendants of the 15th century founder of the Kazakh state, Janybek Khan.  The son of Korkem Wali Sultan, he was given the shortened name Abulmansur at birth.  Abulmansur spent his childhood and part of his youth in exile, spending many years near present-day Burabay on the northern borders of the Kazakh Khanate.  After losing his father to political rivals at the age of thirteen, Abulmansur moved back south towards present-day Kyzylorda. First, he worked as a shepherd in a noble  Tole Bi and then Dauletgeldi Bai a herdsman. The ill-dressed and emaciated boy was called by the contemptuous name of "Sabalak" - the beggar.  But Abulmansur, according to contemporaries, always carried himself with dignity and loved solitude. He kept this pen name "Sabalak" in order not to be noticed to his father's rivals as he was one of the descendant of Janybek Khan. In his teenage years, Abulmansur developed the nickname “Ablai”, which he was more commonly known by for most of his adult life.  In the first half of the 18th century, Ablai Khan proved to be a talented organizer and commander as he headed detachments of the Kazakh militia during the Kazakh-Dzungar Wars. He participated in the most significant battles against the Dzungars from the 1720s to the 1750s, for which he was declared a "batyr" ("hero") by the people.  Due to his strength, he was also bestowed with the honorific Kazakh title Shah-i-Turan (Persian for "King of Turan").  He was the last ruler of the Kazakh Khanate to hold this honorific title since the khanate collapsed shortly after his death.  

Ablai's activity aimed to create a strong and independent Kazakh state. He headed the unified forces of the Kazakhs and furthered the centralization of state power in Kazakhstan. Until his election as the khan of the three jüzes, Ablai had to compete with Abul-Mambet Khan and his descendants of Middle jüz for leadership. Initially, Russia recognized Abul-Mambet Khan as the Khan of Middle jüz, while Ablai was supported by China. Ablai's talent in playing China against Russia gradually made him the unrivaled Khan of the steppe. Unlike Abul Khair Khan of Little jüz, Ablai never submitted to Russian rule. In 1771, after the death of Abulmambet Khan, power was to be inherited by one of his younger brothers or son Abilpeiz , however, the sultans and heads of clans at the kurultai (congress) in Burabay , with the participation of the influential biys of the Middle jüz Kazybek biy and Kanai biy, Abylai was elected as the Kazakh khan. He extended his power to significant areas of the Senior and Junior jüzes, considering himself the khan of all three jüzes.  

The Russian Empress requested that the title of khan should be recognized and officially approved by Russia. To that end, she sent an official letter to Qyzyljar, where Abylai was expected to receive the title in 1779. He never showed up at the fort, declining Russia's request to appoint him as the khan of Middle jüz. In contrast to Ablai, other khans and sultans had been competing for the lavish gifts and stipends of the Emperors of Russia in return for their submission.  Ablai Khan refused to bow down to the expanding Russian Empire and instead chose to strengthen the Kazakhs by promoting Islam and the concept of jihad throughout the state as an effort to resist foreign powers.  

During the Qing campaigns against the Dzungars, Ablai Khan chose not to take sides. He sheltered the Dzungar Oirat taishis Amursana and Dawachi from attacks by the Khoshut-Orait King of Tibet, Lha-bzang Khan, as the Dzungar Khanate fractured following the death of Galdan Tseren in 1745. However, once Amursana and Dawachi were no longer allies, Ablai Khan took the opportunity to capture herds and territory from the Dzungars.

During Amursana's rebellion against the Qing in 1755-56, Ablai Khan offered him sanctuary at one point and refused to hand him over despite the threat of a raid on his territory. However, by 1757, Ablai Khan had acknowledged Chinese suzerainty. Ablai was then confirmed as Kazakh Khan by both the Chinese and the Russians. He led numerous campaigns against Khanate of Kokand and the Kyrgyz. In the last campaign his troops liberated many cities in Southern Kazakhstan and even captured Tashkent. Then he proceeded to present-day Kyrgyzstan and won a furious battle with troops of local warlords. Upon his death in 1781 he was interred in the Mausoleum of Khoja Ahmed Yasavi in Hazrat-e Turkestan.

Following his death, Ablai's sons, namely Khanzada Wali Sultan, Khanzada Qasim Sultan, and Khanzada Adil Sultan, fought against each other to take the throne.  In 1781, Wali Sultan became was named khan of the Kazakhs, succeeding his father after months of battle for succession.

Legacy
One of his descendants was Shoqan Walikhanov (1835-1865), a Kazakh scholar and historian.
Abylai Khan University, founded in 1941, is named after Ablai Khan.
In 1993, Ablai Khan appeared on the 100 Kazakh tenge banknote.
The life of Ablai Khan is the subject of the 2005 Kazakhstani film Nomad.
There is a ceremonial slow march in the Military Band Service named after Ablai Khan
A street in central Almaty is named after Ablai Khan.
Abylai Khan (monument)

See also

List of Kazakh khans
Kenesary Khan

References

Sources
Alexei I. Levshin,  (St. Petersburg,. 1832).
 Website on the Kazakh Diaspora
History of Kazakhstan to 1700 Encyclopædia Britannica Online.

1711 births
1781 deaths
Kazakh khans
Kazakhstani Sunni Muslims